Lille Syd ("Little South") is a passenger railway line on the Danish island of Zealand, formerly connecting the towns of Roskilde and Næstved by way of Køge.

History
The railway was built as part of the Zealand South Line (Sjællandske Sydbane) which was inaugurated on 4 October 1870. After 1924, most trains used the Ringsted-Næstved Line instead of Lille Syd.

In 2012, it was decided to electrify the section between Køge and Næstved. The works were completed in March 2019.

Since December 2020, the northern part of the Lille Syd route, between Køge and Roskilde, has been served by an extension of Østbanen. In April 2023, DSB will start operating regional trains on the Næstved–Køge–Copenhagen route via the high speed Copenhagen–Køge Nord Line.

Stations

References

External links
 Official website

Railway lines in Denmark
Railway lines opened in 1870
1870 establishments in Denmark
Rail transport in Region Zealand